Sergal (Greek: Σερραϊκή Βιομηχανία Γάλακτος), Serres Milk Industry, is the name of a Greek dairy products company based in Serres, Macedonia, Greece.

It was founded in 1964 by Agrotiki Bank and was sold to private sector in 1995.

References

Food and drink companies of Greece
Greek brands
Food and drink companies established in 1964
Companies based in Serres
Dairy products companies of Greece
Greek companies established in 1964